"Slumville Sunrise" is a song by English singer-songwriter Jake Bugg. It was released as the second single from his second studio album Shangri La (2013). It was released as a digital download in the United Kingdom on 18 October 2013. The song was written by Bugg and Iain Archer and produced by Rick Rubin. It charted at number 81 on the UK Singles Chart.

Track listings

Release history

References

External links 
 

Jake Bugg songs
2013 singles
Songs written by Jake Bugg
Songs written by Iain Archer
Mercury Records singles
Song recordings produced by Rick Rubin
2013 songs